Aanum Pennum is a 2021 Indian Malayalam-language anthology film featuring three segments directed by Venu, Aashiq Abu and Jay K.

The film explores the stories of man-woman relationships in the backdrop of three different timelines with each segment telling a story on romance, betrayal and lust. The anthology features an ensemble cast of Parvathy Thiruvothu, Asif Ali, Joju George, Samyuktha, Roshan Mathew, Darshana Rajendran, Indrajith Sukumaran, Nedumudi Venu, Kaviyoor Ponnamma and Basil Joseph. Bijibal and Dawn Vincent composes the original songs and background score. The film is presented by Rajeev Ravi and produced by C. K. Padma Kumar and M. Dileep Kumar under Prime Production.

Short films

Production
Jay K.'s film has completed filming in 2019 while, other films are in different stages of production. Venu's segment which is set in the backdrop of 1950s was shot in Palakkad. Aashiq Abu's segment was filmed during November 2019.

Music
The first song from the film was released on 26 March 2021 by Manorama Music on their YouTube.

Release
The film was released on 26 March 2021. The film is available for online streaming on Amazon Prime Video, Saina Play and Koode.

Reception
Baradwaj Rangan of Film Companion South wrote "Rani, the third film is the real standout. If you take just the form, ignoring the content for a moment, the way the scenes are written with the dialogue and silence, the way the music kicks in on time and goes out, the unexpected twist with an elderly couple and a Biblical confusion that comes to haunt a man...it doesn’t feel like a film about something specific. It feels like snapshots pulled out of people’s lives, which is the toughest thing for a filmmaker to do. Rani, with a breathtaking ending, is the only film that worked in this anthology."

References

External links
 

2021 films
2020s Malayalam-language films
Indian anthology films
Films shot in Palakkad
Films directed by Aashiq Abu